The Koutsos is a folk dance from Didymoteicho, Greece. It is very widespread in Macedonia and Thrace.

See also
Music of Greece
Greek dances

References
Ελληνικοί παραδοσιακοί χοροί: κουτσός

Greek dances